Poovattoor Bhagavathy Temple is a temple in Poovattoor, Kollam, Kerala, India.

References

Bhagavathi temples in Kerala
Hindu temples in Kollam district